Swimming at the 1959 Southeast Asian Peninsular Games was held in Bangkok, Thailand. The competition featured 7 male events swum in a long course (50m) pool.

Results

Medal table

Swimming
Southeast Asian Peninsular Games

References
http://eresources.nlb.gov.sg/newspapers/Digitised/Issue/straitstimes19591214.aspx
http://eresources.nlb.gov.sg/newspapers/Digitised/Issue/straitstimes19591215.aspx
http://eresources.nlb.gov.sg/newspapers/Digitised/Issue/straitstimes19591216.aspx